The siege of Saint-Jean-d'Angély (French: siège de Saint-Jean-d'Angély) was a siege (military blockade), accomplished by the young French king Louis XIII in 1621, against the Protestant stronghold of Saint-Jean-d'Angély led by Rohan's brother Benjamin de Rohan, duc de Soubise. Saint-Jean-d'Angély was a strategic city controlling the approach to the Huguenot stronghold of La Rochelle.

The city was captured after only 26 days, on 24 June 1621.

Louis XIII then sent a small army for the Blockade of La Rochelle, and continued to the south to lead the siege of Montauban, which he abandoned after 2 months. After a lull, Louis XIII resumed his campaign with the siege of Montpellier, which ended in stalemate, leading to the 1622 peace of Montpellier, which temporarily confirmed the right of the Huguenots in France.

See also
 Huguenot rebellions

Notes

1621 in France
Saint-Jean-d'Angely, Siege of
Conflicts in 1621
Saint-Jean-D'angely
History of Charente-Maritime
Huguenot rebellions